Villeneuve-Triage is a railway station in Villeneuve-Saint-Georges, Val-de-Marne, Paris, France. The station is on the Paris–Marseille railway. The station is served by Paris' express suburban rail system, the RER. The train services are operated by SNCF.

Train services
The station is served by the following service(s):

Local services (RER D) Paris–Villeneuve St Georges–Juvisy–Évry Centre–Corbeil Essonnes
Local services (RER D) Creil–Orry la Ville–Gouissainville–St Denis–Paris–Villeneuve St Georges–Juvisy–Évry–Corbeil Essonnes

See also 

 List of stations of the Paris RER

References

Railway stations in Val-de-Marne
Réseau Express Régional stations